Stepan Leidtorp (born 21 July 1902 in Kaiu Parish, Harju County) was an Estonian politician. He was a member of V Riigikogu. He was a member of the Riigikogu since 25 January 1935. He replaced Hans Martinson.

References

1902 births
Year of death missing
Members of the Riigikogu, 1932–1934
People from Harju County